The Union of 17 October (Soyuz 17 Oktyabrya), commonly known as the Octobrist Party (Russian: Октябристы, Oktyabristy), was a liberal-reformist constitutional monarchist political party in late Imperial Russia. It represented moderately right-wing, anti-revolutionary, and constitutionalist views.

History

The party's programme of moderate constitutionalism called for the fulfilment of Tsar Nicholas II's October Manifesto granted at the peak of the Russian Revolution of 1905. Founded in late October 1905, from 1906 the party was led by the industrialist Alexander Guchkov who drew support from centrist-liberal gentry, businessmen, and some bureaucrats.

Unlike their immediate neighbors to the Left, Constitutional Democrats, the Octobrists were firmly committed to a system of constitutional monarchy. At the same time they emphasised the need for a strong parliament and a government that would be responsible to it. They were generally allied with the governments of Sergei Witte in 1905-1906 and Pyotr Stolypin in 1906-1911, but they criticised the government for taking extralegal measures and a slow pace of reforms, especially after the revolution ended in 1907 and they no longer saw the need for the extraordinary measures that they reluctantly supported in 1905-1907. The Octobrists' programme included private farming and further land reform, which were in tune with Stolypin's programme. They also supported the government in its unwillingness to grant political autonomy to ethnic minorities within the empire, although they generally opposed legal restrictions based on ethnicity and religion.

The Octobrists and groups allied with them did poorly in the 1906 elections of the First and Second State Dumas. However, after the dissolution of the Second State Duma on June 3, 1907 (Old Style), the election law was changed in favour of propertied classes and the party formed the largest faction in the Third State Duma (1907-1912). The apparent failure of the party to take advantage of this majority and inability to influence the politics of the government led to a split within the party in 1913 and poor showing in the 1912 Duma election, resulting in a smaller faction in the Fourth State Duma (1912-1917).

In December 1913, after a November conference in St. Petersburg, the Octobrist party split into three factions, effectively new parties: the left Octobrists (16 deputies, including I. V. Godnev, S. I. Shidlovskii, and Khomiakov), the zemstvo Octobrists (57 deputies, including Rodzianko, N. I. Antonov, and A. D. Protopopov), and the right Octobrists (13 deputies, including N. P. Shubinskii and G. V. Skoropadskii).

With the outbreak of World War I in August 1914, moderate political parties became moribund in Russia. The Octobrists all but ceased to exist outside the capital, St. Petersburg, by 1915. Several of its prominent members, particularly Guchkov and Mikhail Rodzianko, continued to play a significant role in Russian politics until 1917, when they were instrumental in convincing Nicholas II to abdicate during the February Revolution and in forming the Russian Provisional Government. With the fall of the Romanovs in March, the party became one of the ruling parties in the first Provisional Government.

Some members of the party, such as Vladimir Ryabushinsky, later participated in the White Movement after the October Revolution and during the Russian Civil War (1918-1920), becoming active in White émigré circles after the Bolshevik victory in 1920. By that time, the October Revolution had given the term "Octobrist" a completely different meaning and connotation in Russian politics.

In other parts of the Russian Empire
In the Livonian guberniya, a similar party of Baltic German nobility and bourgeoisie named Baltic Constitutional Party (German: Baltische Konstitutionelle Partei) was active; its pendant in the Esthonian guberniya was Esthonian Constitutional Party.

See also
Liberalism in Russia
Russian Revolution of 1905
Duma
Mikhail Rodzianko

Notes

References

External links
V. I. Lenin: A Disorderly Revolution

 
Monarchist parties in Russia
Political parties of the Russian Revolution
Political parties in the Russian Empire
Defunct liberal political parties
Political parties established in 1905
Political parties disestablished in 1917
Liberalism in Russia
Monarchism in Russia
1905 establishments in the Russian Empire